Pandi melam is a classical percussion concert or melam (ensemble) led by the ethnic Kerala instrument called the chenda and accompanied by ilathalam (cymbals), kuzhal and  Kombu.

A full-length Pandi, a melam based on a thaalam (taal) with seven beats, lasts more than two-and-a-half hours, and is canonically performed outside temples. It has basically four stages, each of them with rhythmic cycles (thaalavattam) totalling 56, 28, 14 and seven respectively.

The most celebrated Pandi Melam is staged inside a  temple compound at the Vadakkunnathan shrine's precincts in the central Kerala town of Thrissur. For the last several years, Peruvanam Kuttan Marar is the lead conductor for this symphony of drums known as Elanjithara Melam. Elsewhere, like in the pooram festivals of Aarattupuzha and Peruvanam near Thrissur and the rest of central and northern Kerala, it is performed outside temples.
 
Another ensemble called Panchari Melam, which is similar to Pandi going by the kind of instruments used but different in its rhythmic patterns and presentational gravitas, is predominantly played inside temples. Its masters (both living and dead) are ones who are specialists in Panchari Melam as well.

See also
 Panchari melam
 Panchavadyam
 Thayambaka

External links
 Melam Collections
 Pandi Melam performance

Indian musical groups
Kerala music
Hindu music